Cythara triticea is a species of sea snail, a marine gastropod mollusk in the family Mangeliidae.

This species is considered a nomen dubium.

Description
The length of the shell attains 10 mm.

The longitudinal ribs are oblique. The transverse striae are very fine but distinct. The inner and outer lips are both corrugated. The shell is whitish, with a broad central brown band on the back of the body whorl, which when the shell is worn appears as a spot.

Distribution
This marine species was found in the Indian Ocean.

References

 Kiener, L. C. "Genre Pleurotome (Pleurotoma Lam.)." Genre (1839): 1.

External links
  Tucker, J.K. 2004 Catalog of recent and fossil turrids (Mollusca: Gastropoda). Zootaxa 682: 1–1295.

triticea
Gastropods described in 1840